Italia domanda (literally Italy asks) is an Italian late night television talk show hosted by the Italian journalist Cesara Buonamici and is broadcast on Canale 5 since 2013.

References

Italian television talk shows
Current affairs shows
2013 Italian television series debuts
2010s Italian television series
Canale 5 original programming